Adrian Petroșanu (born 8 September 1924) was a Romanian basketball player who competed in the 1952 Summer Olympics. He was part of the Romanian basketball team, which was eliminated in the first round of the 1952 tournament. He played both matches.

References

External links
 

1924 births
Possibly living people
Basketball players at the 1952 Summer Olympics
Olympic basketball players of Romania
Romanian men's basketball players